All My Life is the sixth album by Brazilian heavy metal band Viper, released in June 2007. It was their first studio album in more than a decade and was Ricardo Bocci's first album with the band. The original tentative title for this album was Do It All Again. All My Life was remixed and remastered in 2021 by Andre Cortada and Val Santos and featured bonus tracks, including a cover of "Prowler" by Iron Maiden, 2005 demos (P. Passarell, Machado, Y. Passarell, Martin), and 2006 demos.

Track listing

Personnel 
 Ricardo Bocci – vocals
 Felipe Machado – guitar
 Val Santos – guitar
 Pit Passarell – bass guitar, vocals
 Renato Graccia – drums

Additional musicians 
 André Matos – vocals on "Love Is All"
 Yves Passarel – guitar solo on "Violet" and "Prowler" (bonus track)
 Andre Cortada – all pianos & keyboards

References

2007 albums
Viper (band) albums